Aughnanure Castle (Caisleán Achadh na nlubhar in Irish) is a tower house in Oughterard, County Galway, Ireland. It is situated in the west of Ireland. It was built by the O' Flaherty's in the 16th century.

History
The castle was built by the O'Flaherty family in the 16th century, one of Connacht's most notable lord families. Aughnanure is one of over 200 tower houses in County Galway, constructed mainly by Gaelic and  Anglo-Norman land owning families. The tower lies close to the shores of Lough Corrib, and translates to "the field of the yews" in Irish (Achadh na nlubhar).

The castle was controlled by the O'Flaherty chieftains until 1572, when it was captured by Sir Edward Fitton, President of Connaught, and granted to a junior member of the clan who accepted the legal formalities of recognizing "the Crown." It was used to blockade Galway during the Cromwellian invasion. Soon after, it was granted to the Earl of Clanrickard, and then reclaimed by the O'Flahertys. It later fell into the hands of Lord St George as the foreclosure of a mortgage. It is now managed by the Office of Public Works, the Irish State body responsible for national monuments and historic properties.

References

External links

Photos of Aughnanure Castle, startpage.ie; accessed 2 December 2016.

Buildings and structures completed in the 16th century
Castles in County Galway
Ruins in the Republic of Ireland
National Monuments in County Galway
O'Flaherty dynasty
Historic house museums in the Republic of Ireland
Museums in County Galway
Tower houses in the Republic of Ireland